ChiantiBanca (full name Credito Cooperativo, Società Cooperativa) is an Italian bank based in Monteriggioni, Tuscany.

The bank was a cooperative bank. However, in 2016 the bank demutualized. In the same year the bank also absorbed Banca di Pistoia Credito Cooperativo and Banca Area Pratese Credito Cooperativo.

History
Banca del Chianti Fiorentino e Monteriggioni was formed in 2010 by the merger of Banca del Chianti Fiorentino (founded in 1909) and Banca Monteriggioni (founded in  1924). In 2012 the bank absorbed Credito Cooperativo Fiorentino (founded in 1909).

In 2016 the bank demutualized. In the same year the bank also absorbed Banca di Pistoia Credito Cooperativo and Banca Area Pratese Credito Cooperativo.

Sponsorship
Banca Area Pratese was a sponsor of the football club A.C. Prato. In 2016 ChiantiBanca sponsored Prato directly as their shirt sponsor. ChiantiBanca also sponsored of S.S. Robur Siena.

References

Former cooperative banks of Italy
Banks of Italy
Companies based in Tuscany
Banks established in 2010
Italian companies established in 2010
Metropolitan City of Florence
Province of Siena
Monteriggioni